Rebrikha is the name of two rural localities in Rebrikhinsky District of Altai Krai, Russia:
Rebrikha, Rebrikhinsky Selsoviet, Rebrikhinsky District, Altai Krai, a selo in Rebrikhinsky Selsoviet
Rebrikha, Stantsionno-Rebrikhinsky Selsoviet, Rebrikhinsky District, Altai Krai, a station in Stantsionno-Rebrikhinsky Selsoviet